George Richard Haley Jr. (October 2, 1937 – March 10, 2023) was an American professional football player who was a cornerback in the National Football League (NFL) for the Washington Redskins, the Minnesota Vikings, and the Pittsburgh Steelers.  He played college football at the University of Pittsburgh and was selected in the ninth round of the 1959 NFL Draft.

Biography
Haley was a player personnel analyst for the Miami Dolphins. 

Haley was director of player personnel for the Pittsburgh Steelers from 1971–1990 as well as the New York Jets from 1991–2007. Haley is frequently credited with having selected the Steelers' renowned 1974 NFL Draft class which included four future inductees in the Pro Football Hall of Fame. The rookies—Lynn Swann, Jack Lambert, John Stallworth, and Mike Webster—would help lead the team to Super Bowl IX and three more Super Bowl championships by the end of the decade.

Dick Haley was the father of Todd Haley, a former head coach of the Kansas City Chiefs.

Haley died on March 10, 2023, at the age of 85.

References

1937 births
2023 deaths
American football cornerbacks
Miami Dolphins personnel
Minnesota Vikings players
New York Jets personnel
Cleveland Browns personnel
Pittsburgh Panthers football players
Pittsburgh Steelers executives
Pittsburgh Steelers players
Washington Redskins players
People from Washington County, Pennsylvania
Players of American football from Pennsylvania
Sportspeople from the Pittsburgh metropolitan area